Svetlana Viktorovna Korolyova (born September 7, 1973 in Zhambyl) is a water polo player from Kazakhstan, who represented her native country in two consecutive Summer Olympics, starting in 2000. She finished in 6th and 8th place with the Kazakhstani national team.

References
sports-reference

1973 births
Living people
People from Jambyl Region
Kazakhstani female water polo players
Water polo players at the 2000 Summer Olympics
Water polo players at the 2004 Summer Olympics
Olympic water polo players of Kazakhstan